The Chicago Inter Ocean, also known as the Chicago Inter-Ocean, is the name used for most of its history for a newspaper published in Chicago, Illinois, from 1865 until 1914. Its editors included Charles A. Dana and Byron Andrews.

History

Founding
The history of the Inter Ocean can be traced back to 1865 with the founding of the Chicago Republican, a partisan newspaper that supported the Republican party.  Jacob Bunn, a prominent Illinois financier and industrialist, was the principal founder, and at one time the sole owner, of the Chicago Republican Company, and cooperated with several other Illinois financiers to establish the newspaper company in 1865. After enjoying both economic success and the chaotic blow of the 1871 Chicago Fire, the Republican was relaunched in 1872 as the Chicago-based Inter Ocean, a newspaper intended to appeal to an upscale readership. William Penn Nixon became president of the Inter-Ocean in 1876 and remained there, also as editor-in-chief, until his death in 1912.

Growth

With the building of transcontinental railroads, it was possible to deliver periodical newspapers by mail throughout the central and western U.S.  The Inter Ocean developed a family of semi-weekly, weekly and Sunday editions that were intended to become a definitive source of news for businesspeople throughout the American West, and in fact fulfilled that role for several decades.

The growth of linotype newspapers printed on inexpensive newsprint in the 1890s led to another upheaval in the newspaper industry.  Many non-Chicago subscribers to the Inter Ocean no longer needed the weekly paper and dropped their subscriptions.

The weakened paper fell in 1895 into the hands of Charles Yerkes, the notorious Chicago streetcar boss, who returned the newspaper to the partisan, subordinate role it had fulfilled in its youth. George Wheeler Hinman bought a controlling interest in the paper in 1906 and sold it to H. H. Kohlsaat in 1912.

Demise
The paper stopped publication in 1914.  Hinman bought back the paper at a receiver's sale in May 1914 (which came about because Kolhsaat had failed to pay the balance owed on a note used to purchase the paper) and immediately sold it to James Keeley, then general manager of the Chicago Tribune, who also bought the Chicago Record Herald at the same time.  Readers decided that Keeley's new consolidated newspaper should be named The Chicago Herald, which name it held until it was bought by William Randolph Hearst's  Chicago Examiner in 1918.  This further consolidation created the Chicago Herald-Examiner.

Locations

The Inter Ocean was published in four locations during its existence.  

From 1873 to 1880, it stood at 119 Lake Street, under the old Chicago street numbering.

From 1880 to 1890 it stood at 85 West Madison.  
In 1889 Adler & Sullivan designed a steel-framed building to be constructed on the small lot at the NWC of Madison and Deaborn, connected to the adjoining five-story Dearborn Building (1872–73) that sat behind, and with a distinctive corner clock-spire.  The spire was removed sometime before the building’s demolition. The Inter-Ocean Building was converted into the Hotel Grant around 1895, when the Inter-Ocean newspaper was sold to traction magnate Charles Yerkes.  The Grant was considered a second-class hotel. That building was razed in either 1940 or 1941. 

Its final home was a three-story headquarters built at 57 W. Monroe, completed in 1901 to designs by William Carbys Zimmerman.  This building ultimately became the Monroe Theater, then was razed in 1977.

Notable people
 Eunice Gibbs Allyn
 Alice Hobbins Porter
 H. T. Webster

References

External links

Defunct newspapers published in Chicago
Publications established in 1865
Publications disestablished in 1914